The Book of Unwritten Tales is a point-and-click adventure video game created by German developer King Art Games. A prequel called The Book of Unwritten Tales: The Critter Chronicles was released in 2012. A sequel, The Book of Unwritten Tales 2, was released on February 20, 2015.

Gameplay 
The game challenges the player with a series of puzzles and brain teasers presented as a traditional point and click adventure game. The puzzles are embedded in an adventure story that takes most players an average of 20 hours to complete. There are 60 locations to explore with a total of 40 non-player characters and about 250 interactible items.

A notable feature of The Book of Unwritten Tales is that the player controls four different characters. In some scenes it is possible to switch between two or three active characters. Making explicit use of this mechanic, some puzzles require the playable characters to exchange items or otherwise cooperate.

Plot 

In a world torn by war, the aged gremlin archaeologist Mortimer McGuffin harbors the dark secret of a powerful artifact. Whoever calls this artifact its own will determine the fate of the world. While the Army of Shadows sends out its best and most devious agents to discover the secret, the Alliance's three heroes find themselves involuntarily drawn into the crisis...

Reception

Domestic

International

The Book of Unwritten Tales received "favorable" reviews according to the review aggregation website Metacritic.

The Escapist gave it all five stars and said, "If you're going to try and woo a modern gaming audience with old-fashioned gameplay, you'd better be pretty special. The Book of Unwritten Tales is. It's smart, funny, [and] well-crafted and has tons of heart." 411Mania gave it 8.1 out of 10 and said that the game "harkens back to the golden age of point-and-clicks and does a great job of it. Fans of the genre will love seeing a new entry into the genre that's enjoyable to play. Other PC gamers may want to check it out, as even the puzzles don't require a huge amount of thinking to solve." The Digital Fix gave it eight out of ten and called it "a thoroughly entertaining and engaging adventure game with a classic fantasy storyline, well thought-out plot lines, loveable characters, and plenty of humour that is must for anybody who likes point and click adventures".

In 2011, Adventure Gamers named The Book of Unwritten Tales the 64th-best adventure game ever released.

See also
Deponia
The Next Big Thing

References

External links 
 
 

2009 video games
Adventure games
King Art Games games
Fantasy video games
Linux games
MacOS games
Point-and-click adventure games
Single-player video games
Video games developed in Germany
Video games featuring female protagonists
Video games with expansion packs
Windows games
The Adventure Company games